Hamza Čataković (born 15 January 1997) is a Bosnian professional footballer who plays as a forward.

Čataković started his professional career at Sarajevo, before joining Trenčín in 2017.

Club career

Early career
Čataković started playing football at local clubs, before joining Sarajevo's youth academy in 2015. In July 2015, Čataković won the golden boot at the CEE Cup in Czech Republic, with 6 goals. He made his professional debut against Slavija on 4 November 2015 at the age of 18. On 20 March 2016, he scored his first professional goal against the same opponent.

In June 2016, he suffered a severe knee injury, which was diagnosed as anterior cruciate ligament tear and was sidelined for almost a year.

Trenčín
In January 2017, while still recovering from the injury, Čataković was loaned to Slovak team AS Trenčín until the end of season. In June, he signed a three-year deal with them. He scored on his competitive debut for the club in UEFA Europa League qualifier against Torpedo Kutaisi on 29 June. A month later, on his league debut, he provided an assist for the winning goal against Senica. On 10 March 2018, he scored his first league goal, in an away loss to Spartak Trnava.

In January 2020, he extended his contract until June 2021.

International career
Čataković represented Bosnia and Herzegovina on various youth levels.

Career statistics

Club

References

External links

1997 births
Living people
People from Cazin
Bosniaks of Bosnia and Herzegovina
Bosnia and Herzegovina Muslims
Bosnia and Herzegovina footballers
Bosnia and Herzegovina youth international footballers
Bosnia and Herzegovina under-21 international footballers
Bosnia and Herzegovina expatriate footballers
Association football forwards
FK Sarajevo players
AS Trenčín players
Premier League of Bosnia and Herzegovina players
Slovak Super Liga players
Expatriate footballers in Slovakia
Bosnia and Herzegovina expatriate sportspeople in Slovakia
First Professional Football League (Bulgaria) players
PFC CSKA Sofia players